Michel Verschueren (17 March 1931 – 14 September 2022) was a Belgian businessman and sporting director.

A former footballer, Verschueren was manager and trainer for multiple clubs, notably serving as manager for R.S.C. Anderlecht from 1981 to 2003. He was known by the nicknames "Mister Michel" and "The Silver Fox" and stood out on occasion for his controversial opinions.

Verschueren died in Meise on 14 September 2022, at the age of 91.

References

1931 births
2022 deaths
Belgian businesspeople
R.S.C. Anderlecht managers
KU Leuven alumni
People from Flemish Brabant
Association football controversies
Controversies in Belgium